West Jefferson High School may refer to:

West Jefferson High School (Idaho) in Terreton, Idaho
West Jefferson High School (Louisiana) in Jefferson Parish, Louisiana
West Jefferson High School (Ohio) in West Jefferson, Ohio